Fetinino is a rural locality (a village) in Semyonkovskoye Rural Settlement, Vologodsky District, Vologda Oblast, Russia. The population was 742 as of 2002. There are 6 streets.

Geography 
Yakovlevskoye is the nearest rural locality.

References 

Rural localities in Vologodsky District